Li Ching-Chao is a crater on Mercury. It has a diameter of 61 kilometers. Its name was adopted by the International Astronomical Union (IAU) in 1976. Li Ching-Chao is named for the Chinese poet Li Qingzhao, who lived from 1081 to c. 1141.

References

Impact craters on Mercury